James Hughes Hancock (April 30, 1931 – July 24, 2020) was a United States district judge of the United States District Court for the Northern District of Alabama.

Education and career

Born in Montgomery, Alabama, Hancock received a Bachelor of Science degree from the University of Alabama in 1953 and was a lieutenant in the United States Army from 1953 to 1955. He received his Bachelor of Laws from the University of Alabama School of Law in 1957. He was a law clerk for Justice John L. Goodwyn of Alabama Supreme Court. He was in private practice in Birmingham from 1957 to 1973.

Federal judicial service

On March 20, 1973, Hancock was nominated by President Richard Nixon to a seat on the United States District Court for the Northern District of Alabama vacated by Judge Seybourn Harris Lynne. Hancock was confirmed by the United States Senate on April 10, 1973, and received his commission on April 17, 1973. He assumed senior status on May 1, 1996.

See also
 List of United States federal judges by longevity of service

References

Sources
 

1931 births
2020 deaths
Judges of the United States District Court for the Northern District of Alabama
United States district court judges appointed by Richard Nixon
20th-century American judges
University of Alabama alumni
University of Alabama School of Law alumni
United States Army officers
21st-century American judges